Jeff Bray is the Executive Director of the Downtown Victoria Business Association. He is a former Canadian politician, who served as a BC Liberal Member of the Legislative Assembly of British Columbia from 2001 to 2005, representing the riding of Victoria-Beacon Hill.

External links
Jeff Bray
 Jeff Bray, downtown Victoria Business Association

British Columbia Liberal Party MLAs
1964 births
Politicians from Victoria, British Columbia
Living people
21st-century Canadian politicians